This is a list of Chapters of the Navajo Nation. The Navajo Nation is divided up geographically into Chapters which are similar in function to municipalities. Chapters are subdivisions of Agencies which are similar in function to counties. Chapter officials operating out of a Chapter House register voters who may then vote to elect Delegates for the Navajo Nation Council or the President of the Navajo Nation.

The following table contains chapter names, chapter names in Navajo, a rough literal English translation, population, and land area estimates.

Notes

References

 
Navajo history
American Indian reservations in Arizona
American Indian reservations in Colorado
American Indian reservations in New Mexico
American Indian reservations in Utah
States and territories established in 1868
1868 establishments in the United States
Native American-related lists